Mauro Pane (March 31, 1963 – 9 February 2014) was an Italian driver, champion kart driver (title of 1986) and owner of the company "F1 Storiche (Historic F1)" in Sannazzaro de' Burgondi, the only European company that repairs and maintains vintage models of single-seater racing cars. Pane was employed as a stunt double in the film by Ron Howard's Rush as a stunt driver for actor Daniel Brühl. Who played Niki Lauda

In 2008 Pane was the Historic Formula One Champion with Tyrrell P34 and 2012 with a Lola T370 in Monte Carlo.

Pane died when his car plunged into a river between Tromello and Gambolò in Lomellina in February 2014.  He was 50. The body of a passenger, a Romanian girl named Catalina Ganea, was also found in the car.

References

1963 births
Italian racing drivers
2014 deaths
Italian stunt performers